Hunan University of Science & Technology (HNUST) is an institution of higher learning in Xiangtan, Hunan of China, under the jointly jurisdiction of central government and provincial government, and is mainly administered by Hunan Province. HNUST is listed in the “Domestic First-Class Universities” of Hunan Province.

History 
Hunan University of Science & Technology (HNUST), which evolves from Northern Hunan Construction College founded in 1949 and was formed in 2003 by the merger of Xiangtan Institute of Technology and Xiangtan Normal University.

Rankings and Reputation 
As of 2021, Hunan University of Science and Technology was ranked 688th by SCImago Institutions Rankings among research universities around the world. It ranked 101st in China, 261st in Asia and 988th globally by the U.S. News & World Report Best Global University Ranking.

The 2022 CWTS Leiden Ranking ranked Hunan University of Science and Technology 1013th in the world based on their publications for the period 2017–202020. The Nature Index 2021 by Nature Research ranked the university among the top 1000 leading research institutions globally for the high quality of research publications in natural science.
Overall, Hunan University of Science and Technology was ranked in the top 1050 universities in the world by several international rankings including the CWTS Leiden Ranking, the U.S. News & World Report, Nature Index and SCImago Institutions Rankings.

Subjects Rankings

References

External links

Universities and colleges in Hunan
1949 establishments in China